Narbi Price born in Hartlepool, UK, in 1979, is a British painter and curator.

Education 

Price has a Doctor of Philosophy degree (PhD) in Fine Art from Newcastle University where he researched the legacy of the Ashington Group painters, he also holds a Master of Fine Art degree (MFA) from Newcastle University, and a Bachelor of Arts degree with Honours (BA Hons) in Fine Art from Northumbria University.

Career 

Narbi Price is a 2012 prize winner in the John Moore's Painting Prize, 2017 winner of the Contemporary British Painting Prize and Visual Artist of the Year at The Journal Culture Awards 2018. Price's influences include David Hockney and George Shaw along with many abstract artists. Artist Jo Vickers wrote of Price's paintings, "At first look, his photorealistic paintings are demonstrations of clear technical ability, albeit with unconventional subject matter. But Narbi’s processes, techniques and motivation give the paintings an air of defiance that suggests that the artist is painting primarily for himself, which ironically, might be the key to their popularity".

Critic Matthew Collings wrote that Price's work "appears photographic but up close it jumps into a completely different dimension, becoming dancing loose dots and blips, free of any representation whatsoever."

In 2018 Price curated an exhibition of unseen Pitmen Painters works at Woodhorn Museum, Ashington, Northumberland, UK. He is a member of Contemporary British Painting

Selected solo exhibitions 

 2020 - The Ashington Paintings: Redux, XL Gallery, Newcastle University, UK
 2019 - All I Start Will End, Herrick Gallery, London
 2018 - The Ashington Paintings, Woodhorn Museum, Ashington, Northumberland, UK
 2017 - This Must Be The Place, Vane Gallery, Newcastle upon Tyne, UK
 2016 - Codeword, Paper Gallery, Manchester, UK 
2014 - Narbi Price, Galleria SIX, Milan, Italy

Selected group exhibitions 
 2022 - Everybody Knows This Is Nowhere: Painting in the North East. Now., Newcastle Contemporary Art, Newcastle upon Tyne 
 2020 - Picture Palace, Transition Gallery, London
 2020 - Beyond Other Horizons, Iași Palace of Culture, Romania
 2019 - neo:artprize, Bolton Museum & Art Gallery, UK
 2019 - Royal Academy of Arts Summer Exhibition, Royal Academy of Arts, London
 2019 - Made in Britain; 82 Painters of the 21st Century, Muzeum Narodowe w Gdansk, Poland
 2018 - St. Nowhere, Lewisham Arthouse, London
 2018 - Paint North, Ladybeck Project Space, Leeds, UK

Selected publications and media 

 2018 - The Ashington Paintings, Narbi Price & Matthew Collings, Ashington Group Trustees
 2018 - Pitmen Painters: Unseen, Narbi Price & William Feaver, Ashington Group Trustees
2017 - Drawing and Painting – Materials and Techniques for Contemporary Artists, Kate Wilson, Thames & Hudson
 2016 - Vitamin P3: New Perspectives in Painting’, Barry Schwabsky, Phaidon Press Limited
2012 - John Moores Painting Prize 2012 Catalogue, Ann Bukantas (Ed.), National Museums Liverpool

References

External links 
 Narbi Price (Official)
 Contemporary British Painting - Narbi Price

21st-century British painters
British curators
English contemporary artists
Alumni of Newcastle University
Hartlepool
1979 births
Living people